Asher Achinstein (December 6, 1900 – September 20, 1998) was an American economist and a member of the Council of Economic Advisors during the Dwight D. Eisenhower administration.

Biography
Achinstein was born on December 6, 1900 in New York City. He was Jewish. He graduated with a B.A. from the City College of New York and with a M.A. and PhD. from Columbia University. He worked for the New York State Board of Housing. In 1951, he accepted a position with the Legislative Reference Service of the Library of Congress conducting economic research for the members of Congress; he remained in the position until 1970. In 1954, he was appointed to the Council of Economic Advisers by President Dwight D. Eisenhower.

In 1950, Achinstein published Introduction to Business Cycles.

Personal life
In the 1930s, he married Betty Comras (died 1964); they had one son, philosopher Peter J. Achinstein. In 1965, he married Martha Levitsky. He died on September 20, 1998 in Cross Keys.

References

1900 births
1998 deaths
United States Council of Economic Advisers
Jewish American economists
City College of New York alumni
Columbia Graduate School of Arts and Sciences alumni
20th-century American Jews